The 2012 Ligas Departamentales, the fifth division of Peruvian football (soccer), was played by variable number teams by Departament.

Liga Departamental de Amazonas

First stage

Second stage

Group A

Group B

Final

Liga Departamental de Ancash

First stage

Second stage

Quarterfinals

Semifinals

Liga Departamental de Apurímac

First stage

Second stage

Final stage

Liga Departamental de Arequipa

First stage

Second stage

Final stage

Liga Departamental de Ayacucho

First stage

Second stage

Third stage

Semifinals

Final

Liga Departamental de Cajamarca

First stage

Second stage

Quarterfinals

Semifinals

Liga Departamental del Callao

First stage

Group A

Group B

Group C

Tiebreaker

Second stage

Semifinals

Liga Departamental de Cusco

First stage

Group A

Group B

Group C

Group D

Group E

Group F

Group G

Quarterfinals

Semifinals

Final

Liga Departamental de Huancavelica

First stage

Second stage

Group A

Group B

Semifinals

Final

Liga Departamental de Huánuco

First stage

Second stage

Third stage

Group A

Group B

Final

Liga Departamental de Ica

First stage

Second stage

Semifinals

Final

Liga Departamental de Junín

First stage

Group stage

Group A

Group B

Group C

Final stage

Liga Departamental de La Libertad

First stage

Group A

Group B

Group C

Group D

Group E

Group F

Quarterfinals

Semifinals

Liga Departamental de Lambayeque

First stage

Group A

Group B

Group C

Semifinals

Final

Liga Departamental de Lima

First stage

Second stage

Quarterfinals

Semifinals

Final

Liga Departamental de Loreto

First stage

Group A

Group B

Group C

Group D

Extra matches

Final stage

Liga Departamental de Madre de Dios

First stage

Second stage

Liga Departamental de Moquegua

First stage

Final

Second Place

Liga Departamental de Pasco

Quarterfinals

Semifinals

Final

Liga Departamental de Piura

Group A

Group B

Group C

Group D

Quarterfinals

Semifinals

Final

Liga Departamental de Puno

First stage

Second stage

Third stage

Group A

Extra match

Group B

Final stage

Liga Departamental de San Martín

First stage

Group A

Group B

Group C

Group D

Group E

Group F

Second stage

Group A

Group B

Liga Departamental de Tacna

First stage

Group A

Group B

Semifinals

Final

Liga Departamental de Tumbes

Standings

Liga Departamental de Ucayali

First stage

Second stage

Final stage

External links
 DeChalaca.com - copaperu.pe la información más completa del "fútbol macho" en todo el Perú

2012
5